Sternotomis rousseti is a species of beetle in the family Cerambycidae. It was described by Allard in 1993.

References

Sternotomini
Beetles described in 1993